Carillons, musical instruments in the percussion family with at least 23 cast bells and played with a keyboard, are found throughout the British Isles as a result of the First World War.Carillons are found throughout the British Isles as a result of the First World War. During the German occupation of Belgium, many of the country's carillons were silenced or destroyed. This news circulated among the Allied Powers, who saw it as "the brutal annihilation of a unique democratic music instrument". The destruction was romanticized in poetry and music, particularly in England. Poetsoften exaggerating realitywrote that the Belgian carillons were in mourning and awaited to ring out on the day of the country's liberation. Edward Elgar composed a work for orchestra which includes motifs of bells and a spoken text anticipating the victory of the Belgian people. He later even composed a work specifically for the carillon. Following the war, countries in the Anglosphere built their own carillons to memorialise the lives lost and to promote world peace, including two in England.

The Carillon Society of Britain and Ireland (CSBI) counts carillons throughout the British Isles. Dove's Guide for Church Bell Ringers, a publication that historically concerns itself with bell sets outfitted for full circle ringing, also counts carillons in the region. According to the two sources, there are fifteen carillons: eight in England, one in the Republic of Ireland, one in Northern Ireland, and five in Scotland. There are no carillons in Guernsey, the Isle of Man, Jersey or Wales.

The heaviest carillon is at the Kirk of St Nicholas in Aberdeen, Scotland, weighing ; the lightest is at the Atkinsons Building in London, weighing . The carillon of St Colman's Cathedral in Cobh has the most bells49. The region has several two- and three-octave carillons. The heaviest two-octave carillon in the worldweighing is located in Newcastle upon Tyne. The carillons were primarily constructed in the interwar period by the English bellfounders Gillett & Johnston and John Taylor & Co. Almost all of the carillons are transposing instruments, all of which transpose such that the lowest note on the keyboard is C.

England

Northern Ireland

Republic of Ireland
According to the CSBI, there is one carillon in the Republic of Ireland, which is located at St Colman's Cathedral in Cobh. In 2019, playing this cathedral's carillon was recognized by the Irish government as key element of the country's living cultural heritage.

Scotland

See also
 Index of campanology articles

Notes

References

Further reading

External links
 World list of carillons as compiled by the World Carillon Federation
 List of all types of bells in the British Isles as compiled by Towerbells.org

Bell towers in Ireland
Bell towers in the United Kingdom
British Isles, List of carillons of the